The Helium Privatization Act of 1996 is a United States statute that ordered the US government to sell much of the National Helium Reserve. The United States 104th Congressional session passed the Act of Congress presenting the legislation to the United States President on September 30, 1996. President Bill Clinton enacted the federal statute into law on October 9, 1996.

The law was described by critics as a "fiasco" due to the formula-based sale price being significantly lower than the market price for helium.  The bill was amended in 2013 to use an auction to sell helium.

References

External links
 
 
 
 
 

Acts of the 104th United States Congress
Helium